The Conde B. McCullough Memorial Bridge, is a cantilever bridge that spans the Coos Bay on U.S. Route 101 near North Bend, Oregon. When completed in 1936 it was named the North Bend Bridge. In 1947 it was renamed in honor of  Conde B. McCullough who died May 5, 1946. This and 10 other major bridges on the Oregon Coast Highway were designed under his supervision.

The Conde B. McCullough Memorial Bridge replaced ferries that had formerly crossed the bay. The bridge is outstanding for its attention to form and detail, and has been placed on the National Register of Historic Places in recognition of its design and cultural and economic importance.

History
Work started on what was then called the North Bend Bridge on July 10, 1934. Glenn S. Paxson, Acting State Bridge Engineer while McCullough took a leave of absence to work on projects in Central America, was the supervising engineer during construction. The resident engineer was Raymond Archibald until 1935, when he joined McCullough, then Dexter R. Smith. The Northwest Roads Company of Portland, Oregon built the piers and the concrete structure. The steel sections of the bridge were built by the Virginia Bridge and Iron Company. The main piers are supported on piles driven into the bay's bed. The main towers of the cantilever section were fabricated off-site and moved to the bridge site in four sections. Work on the cantilever arms moved out in both directions from the tower, with the shoreward arm keeping slightly ahead of the center arm so that it would rest on a temporary support structure to stabilize the bridge. The concrete arch sections were erected using timber falsework. The bridge opened in June 1936.

When the bridge was completed in 1936 it was the longest bridge in Oregon. It was the costliest of the Oregon Coast bridges at $2.14 million (equivalent to approximately $35 million in 2012). Because the five largest bridges on the coastal route were so expensive, their construction was largely funded by the Public Works Administration. The North Bend Bridge was dedicated to its designer, Conde McCullough, in 1947.

The McCullough Bridge was damaged on December 4, 1986 when a Swedish ship, the Elgaren, struck the bottom of the center span. The bridge was closed for repairs.

Description
Because of the long spans and heavily trafficked shipping channel, a cantilever construction was deemed most suitable; a draw span was rejected because it would have to be opened too often. Consequently, the  main span has  of vertical clearance and is part of a  steel cantilever span. The approach spans are concrete arches more typical of McCullough's designs. The ends of the bridge are marked by pedestrian plazas meant to provide a viewing point for the bridge and to provide access to the shoreline. These plazas are detailed with Art Moderne motifs and are provided with built-in benches. The stairs are descend in sweeping curves to the park below.

Designation
The city of North Bend, Oregon, uses images of the bridge extensively in public relations material. The bridge was placed on the National Register of Historic Places on August 5, 2005.

Images

See also

List of bridges documented by the Historic American Engineering Record in Oregon
List of bridges on the National Register of Historic Places in Oregon
List of bridges on U.S. Route 101 in Oregon
National Register of Historic Places listings in Coos County, Oregon

References

External links

ODOT
Bridgemeister.com

Coos-Bay.net

Bridges completed in 1936
Road bridges on the National Register of Historic Places in Oregon
U.S. Route 101
Transportation buildings and structures in Coos County, Oregon
Historic American Engineering Record in Oregon
Bridges by Conde McCullough
Public Works Administration in Oregon
Bridges of the United States Numbered Highway System
National Register of Historic Places in Coos County, Oregon
1936 establishments in Oregon
North Bend, Oregon
Concrete bridges in the United States
Steel bridges in the United States
Cantilever bridges in the United States
Open-spandrel deck arch bridges in the United States